The 1942 All-Pro Team consisted of American football players who were chosen by various selectors for the All-Pro team for the 1942 football season. Teams were selected by, among others, the "official" All-Pro team announced by the NFL and selected by a committee of nine reporters (NFL), the Associated Press (AP), the International News Service (INS), and the New York Daily News (NYDN).

Selections

References

All-Pro Teams
1942 National Football League season